Budišić is a village in Serbia. It is situated in the Mali Zvornik municipality, in the Mačva District of Central Serbia. The village has a Serb ethnic majority and its population numbers 249 people (2002 census), of which 247 are Serbs.

Historical population

1948: 306
1953: 481
1961: 346
1971: 308
1981: 328
1991: 278
2002: 249

References

See also
List of places in Serbia

Populated places in Mačva District